Milan Mitić (born 22 January 1984 in Belgrade) is a Serbian former footballer who played as a defensive midfielder or as a right back.

References

External links
 
 
 
 

1984 births
Living people
Footballers from Belgrade
Serbian footballers
Association football midfielders
Association football defenders
FC Drobeta-Turnu Severin players
CS Turnu Severin players
FC U Craiova 1948 players
FC Politehnica Iași (2010) players
CS Gaz Metan Mediaș players
Liga I players
Liga II players
Serbian expatriate footballers
Serbian expatriate sportspeople in Romania
Expatriate footballers in Romania